Luis Horna and Jaime Yzaga are the most famous Peruvian tennis players. Tennis Hall of Famer and Davis Cup and Wimbledon winner Alejandro Olmedo was born in Peru but played for the United States only for Davis Cup. Laura Arraya is a best Peruvian Tennis player in women's. Her brother is Pablo Arraya, a former Peruvian tennis player.

Although the sport is not quite as popular as others in Peru, the Peruvian tennis team generally does well and is usually at the Americas Zone Group I. Twice Peru has reached the World Group playoffs in 1989 and 1994 Davis Cup, but was not able to advance into the prestigious World Group. In 2007, the Peruvian team, commanded by Luis Horna and Iván Miranda, beat the Belarus team of Max Mirnyi and Vladimir Voltchkov, and will play in the 2008 World Group.

Club Lawn Tennis de la Exposición is in the district of Jesús María in Lima, it is the usual court where Peru plays. The court was found in 1884, and was the home scenario for the golden generation of Peruvian tennis players of the 1980s. Its principal colosseum was named after the Buse Brothers, Enrique and Eduardo Buse.  Enrique played at Wimbledon and the US Open in 1946 and again at the US Open in 1951.

Famous Peruvian tennis players

Men

Women
 Laura Arraya (Peruvian citizen)
Bianca Botto
Patricia Kú Flores

See also
Peruvian tennis players